5 Fingers is a free viewing platform in the Dachstein Mountains of Upper Austria, on Mount Krippenstein. It was named "5 Fingers" by virtue of its hand-like shape.

The viewing platform is less than a 20-minute walk from the Krippenstein Station of the Dachstein cable car line.

Features 
The fingers have different features such as a telescope and a glass floor. The observation deck is illuminated at night, making it visible from Hallstatt and Obertraun.

References

External links 
 
 http://www.cusoon.at 

Buildings and structures in Upper Austria
Dachstein Mountains
Tourist attractions in Upper Austria
Observation decks
Outdoor structures in Austria